Jared Blake is an American country music singer who resides in Nashville, Tennessee. He became known to a wider audience as a contestant on the first season of The Voice, reaching the Top 4 on Blake Shelton's team.

In June 2012, Blake signed a recording contract with Skiddco Music producer Skidd Mills. The first single "Countryfied" from the upcoming debut album, written by Blake, Mills, and Carl Bell (Fuel), was released to radio and iTunes on June 24, 2013. It debuted at No. 79 on the MusicRow Country Breakout chart on December 12, 2013 and peaked at No. 66. Blake's second single "Stomp" was released on June 20, 2014 and the 6 song EP Til Morning Light was released on September 30, 2014. The official music video for "Stomp" was released on October 13, 2014 and reached No. 76 on the MusicRow Country Breakout chart.

Early life
Jared Blake was born in Star City, Arkansas. He wrote his first song when he was five, but started his musical career at about 13 or 14 learning piano and acoustic guitar. In middle school, Jared decided to join the school's choir. His teacher used classical choral training methods, and Jared went on to be selected by the statewide all-region choir. In 1993 Jared entered his first competitions at the Malvern Brick Fest taking second place and also placed at the Lincoln County Fair youth talent competition. In subsequent years Jared won 1st place in the Lincoln County vocal competition and other state and regional talent shows. After coming second to a guy at Country Showdown who got three extra bonus points for writing his own material, Jared began writing his own songs for the competitions, and pinpointed his career decision to become a professional songwriter as well as a singer.

Career

Jared was signed to a publishing contract with Sony/ATV Music Publishing in 2006, ending in 2010. Blake worked four jobs at times, owning a decorative concrete business, writing songs for Sony/ATV and Love Monkey Music (Bob DiPiero), singing demos, and pushing his own music by playing in bars to support his family.

In 2011, he appeared on the debut season of the hit television show The Voice (U.S. season 1); a singing competition which aired on NBC. Jared was the final selection to complete Team Blake, coached by Blake Shelton. His singing performances included a solo of "Good Girls Go Bad" (Cobra Starship), a solo of "Not Ready to Make Nice" (Dixie Chicks) reaching No.23 on iTunes charts, a battle round performance of "Ain't No Mountain High Enough" (Marvin Gaye & Tammi Terrell), a Team Blake group performance of "This Love" (Maroon 5) with Shelton, Dia Frampton, Xenia Martinez, and Patrick Thomas, and a solo of "Use Somebody" (Kings of Leon) reaching No.16 on iTunes charts.

In November 2011 Jared released his first single titled "Don't Mind", and the video was released in February 2012. Jared Blake's single 'Don't Mind' won a spot in WKDQ Country Whuppin' Hall of Fame by defeating Scotty McCreery "Water Tower Town", Montgomery Gentry "So Called Life", Randy Houser "How Country Feels", LoCash Cowboys "C-O-U-N-T-R-Y", and his "The Voice" coach Blake Shelton's "Over".

Jared Blake is currently managed by Cory Gierman, also known as one of the Godfathers of MuzikMafia.

Discography 

Albums

Singles

References

External links 
 Official music video for "Stomp" on YouTube 
 Official music video for "Don't Mind" on YouTube 
 Official music video for "Countryfied" on YouTube 
 ITunes Music Chart Archive 

Living people
American male singer-songwriters
Year of birth missing (living people)
People from Star City, Arkansas
American country singer-songwriters
The Voice (franchise) contestants
Singer-songwriters from Arkansas
Country musicians from Arkansas
21st-century American male singers
21st-century American singers